Reb is a Yiddish or Hebrew honorific traditionally used for Orthodox Jewish men. It is not a rabbinic title.  In writing it is abbreviated as ר׳.  On a gravestone,  ב'ר is an abbreviation for ben/bat reb meaning "son/daughter of the worthy..."  Reb may also be a short form of Rebbe.  It is generally only used for married men, sometimes an equivalent of "Mr."

A never-married man is referred to as Habachur.

History
The title was adopted by Jews at the time of the schism with the Karaites, as a sign of loyalty to  Rabbinic Judaism.

Usage
When addressing someone directly, Reb is usually used with the first name only ("May I help you, Reb Chaim?"). In other circumstances, it can be used with either the first name or the full name ("This is Reb Chaim Jacobs."; "Would you please help Reb Chaim?"). In formal written address, it is usually used along with the full name.

Notes

Titles
Yiddish words and phrases
Orthodox rabbinic roles and titles